Baghajatin railway station is a Kolkata Suburban Railway station on the Main line. It is under the jurisdiction of the Sealdah railway division in the Eastern Railway zone of the Indian Railways. It serves the local area of Baghajatin in Kolkata in the Indian state of West Bengal.

History

Electrification

Station complex
The platform is well sheltered. The station possesses many facilities including water and sanitation. It is well connected to the SH-1. There is a proper approach road to this station.

References

Railway stations in Kolkata
Sealdah railway division
Kolkata Suburban Railway stations
Railway stations opened in 1862
1862 establishments in India
1862 establishments in the British Empire